Prima TV is a Romanian commercial TV channel, famous mainly for the Cronica Cârcotaşilor show and various reality shows aired on this channel.

Overview
Prima TV was launched as one of the first commercial television stations in Romania in December 1997 at 19:00. Until then, on its frequency was known AMEROM CANAL 38 or TeleAmerica. Prima TV was owned and operated by Prima Broadcasting Group, from 2013 to 2020. In 2020, Clever Group acquired Prima TV.

Prima TV reaches 87% of urban population and it is one of the four most successful TV stations in the country. Prima TV is available both on cable and satellite platforms. It was available in analogue terrestrial on channel 38 until June 2015, when it ceased terrestrial transmission in analogue. It was available in DVB-T from 2011, on channel 54, but shifted later to 59. In early 2015, it discontinued its existence on Digital Terrestrial platform.

Imported
That 70's Show (2003–2004)
The Bold and the Beautiful (United States) (2003–2009)
7th Heaven (United States) (2007-2008)
Brothers & Sisters (United States) (2008-2011)
Lost: Naufragiaţii (LOST) (United States) (2008-2010)
H2O: Just Add Water (Australia)
General Hospital (United States)
Blue Water High (Australia)
Neveste disperate (Desperate Housewives) (United States) (2009-2010)
Clinica (Private Practice) (2009-2010)
Mediumul (Medium (TV series)) (USA) (2007-2014)
CSI: Miami (USA)
NCIS (TV series) (USA)
Jericho (2006 TV series) (USA) (2009-2010)
As the Bell Rings (USA)
Love, Inc. (TV series) (USA)
Saved by the Bell (USA)
Hannah Montana (USA)
Cei 4400 (The 4400) (USA)

Series
Mondenii (Romania) (2006–2017)
Trăsniți în NATO (Romania) (2003–2009)
Trăsniți (Romania) (2009–2021)
Nimeni nu-i perfect (Romania) (2008–2021)

Cartoons
Archibald the Koala (France)
Timmy Time (United Kingdom)
Pocoyo (Spain)
Minunata Lume Disney (Disney Classical) (2008-2012)

Jetix hour
Shaman King (Japan) (2007–2010)
Totally Spies! (France-Canada) (2006–2007)
Pucca (co-production) (2007–2009)
W.I.T.C.H. (France-Canada) (2006–2009)
The Kids from Room 402 (???)
Sonic X (Japan) (2006–2007)
June&July (France) (2006–2008)

Disney
DuckTales (United States) (2011)

Shows
Schimb de Mame (2003–present)
O vreau pe Mama înapoi! (2007-2008)
Super Nanny (2005–2008;2021–present)
Bătălia sexelor (2007–2008)
S.O.S. – Salvați-mi casa! (2006–2013)
Big Brother (Romania) (2003–2004)
Banc Show (2000–2017)
Nuntă în 48 de Ore (2007)
Reuniunea de Clasă (2002–2003)
Copiii spun Lucruri Trăsnite (2000-2013)
Vrei să fii miliardar?,now "Vrei să fii milionar?" (2000–2003;2014)
Te crezi mai deștept? (2007–2009)
Calendarul anului, now Calendarul zilei (2008)
112: Poliția in Actiune (2002–2015)
Trădați în Dragoste (2005–2017)
Capra Vecinului (2008-2009)
The Flavours:3 Bucătări (2004–2015)
Experiența Americană (2008-2012)
Ring-Ring (2008-2009)
Levinza prezintă (2001–2015)
Sport, dietă și-o Vedetă (2004–2015)
Sport cu Florentina (2004–2011)
Cronica Cârcotaşilor (2000–present)
Ciao TV (2006–2008)
Interviurile Cristinei Țopescu (2007–2017)
Teo Live (2008-2012)
Momentul Adevărului (2008–2010)
Cireașa de pe Tort (2008–2021)
Calculator prin România (2008)
Megastar (2006–2009)
PokerHeaven (2009)
Vedete-n Figuri (Human Tetris) (2009–2010)
Romania lui Gaiță (2009–2012)
Prima TV Aniversar (every year, 17 December only)
We Love To Entertain You (Original MusicVideo) (2008–2014)
Click! (2014–2015)
Dosarele DNA (2014-2018)
Epic Show (2014–2020)
Sector 7 (2014)
Playtech (2014–2016)
Amintiri din viitor (2014–2015)
Historia.ro (2014)

Nunți de poveste (2015-2018)
Mama mea gătește mai bine (2015–2021)
În bucătărie cu Horia (2018–2022)
Starea nației (2018–present)
Flash monden (2018–present)
Sănătate cu stil (2015–present)
Alege Rețeta Națională (2020–2022)
Selly Show (2020-2021)
Darul Cărții (2020–2021)
Insider Politic (2021–present)
Hai cu Fetele (2021–present)
Exclusiv VIP (2021–present)
Poezie și Delicatețuri (2021–present)
Destinația anului (2021)
Ora de profit.ro (2021–present)
Florin Călinescu Show (2021–present)

News
"Focus" is the television main news bulletin, broadcast daily at 18:00 EET.
FOCUS (14:00; 22:00) (1997-present)
FOCUS 18 (18:00) (1999-present)
FOCUS SPORT (18:55) (1997-present)
FOCUS METEO (1997-present)
FOCUS LA PRIMA ORĂ (08:00) (2021-present)

Distribution
Satellite broadcasting via Intelsat 12 (45°E) stopped in June 2017 and was switched together with Kiss TV to Intelsat 33e (60°E).

References

Television stations in Romania
Television channels and stations established in 1997
ProSiebenSat.1 Media